A shotgun wedding is a wedding hastily arranged due to an unplanned pregnancy.

Shotgun Wedding can also refer to:
Shotgun Wedding, a low-budget 1963 film written by Ed Wood
Shotgun Wedding (1993 film), Australian film based on the Wally Melish siege, directed by Paul Harmon
Shotgun Wedding (2013 film), American comedy film directed by Danny Roew
Shotgun Wedding (2023 film), a 2023 film
"Shotgun Wedding" (Bugs), the 5th episode of season one of Bugs
Shotgun Wedding (album), 1991 album by Lydia Lunch and Rowland S. Howard
Shotgun Wedding, an album by the band Bride
"Shotgun Wedding", a 1965/66/72 single by Roy C